The White Limestone Formation is a Bathonian geologic formation in the United Kingdom, dating to the Middle Jurassic, 168.3 to 166.1 million years ago. Fossil sauropod tracks have been reported from the formation. It is the lateral equivalent of the Blisworth Limestone. It predominantly consists of grey-yellow limestone, typically wackestone and packstone with subordinate ooidal grainstone. The Woodeaton Quarry locality has yielded microvertebrates.

Paleobiota

Dinosaurs

Mammaliamorphs

See also

 List of dinosaur-bearing rock formations
 List of stratigraphic units with sauropodomorph tracks
 Sauropod tracks

Footnotes

References
 Weishampel, David B.; Dodson, Peter; and Osmólska, Halszka (eds.): The Dinosauria, 2nd, Berkeley: University of California Press. 861 pp. .

Bathonian Stage